Mircea Șimon (born 22 January 1954) is a retired Romanian heavyweight boxer. He took up boxing in 1971 at Dinamo Bucharest, coached by Constantin Nour, and won a silver medal at the 1976 Olympics, losing to Teófilo Stevenson in the final. Șimon also won four national senior titles and two bronze medals at the European Amateur Boxing Championships. In 1978 he fled to the United States, where in 1978–1979 he fought 14 bouts as a professional with a record of 12 wins and two draws. He later returned to Romania and coached Marian and Dorel Simion. He then took a break from boxing for ten years, and in 2007 worked with Romanian Boxing Federation to prepare the national team for the 2008 Olympics.

Professional record 

|-
|align="center" colspan=8|12 Wins (10 knockouts, 2 decisions), 2 Draws 
|-
|align=center style="border-style: none none solid solid; background: #e3e3e3"|Res.
|align=center style="border-style: none none solid solid; background: #e3e3e3"|Record
|align=center style="border-style: none none solid solid; background: #e3e3e3"|Opponent
|align=center style="border-style: none none solid solid; background: #e3e3e3"|Type
|align=center style="border-style: none none solid solid; background: #e3e3e3"|Rd., Time
|align=center style="border-style: none none solid solid; background: #e3e3e3"|Date
|align=center style="border-style: none none solid solid; background: #e3e3e3"|Location
|align=center style="border-style: none none solid solid; background: #e3e3e3"|Notes
|-align=center
|style="background:#abcdef;"|Draw
|12–2–0
| align=left| Leroy Caldwell
| PTS || 10 
|1979-09-27	
|align=left| Olympic Auditorium, Los Angeles, California, United States
|align=left|
|-align=center
|Win
|12–1–0
|align=left| Charlie Johnson
| KO || 4 
|1979-08-30 || align=left| Olympic Auditorium, Los Angeles, California, United States
|align=left|
|-align=center
|Win
|11–1–0
|align=left| Koroseta Kid
| KO || 2 
|1979-07-26 || align=left| Olympic Auditorium, Los Angeles, California, United States
|align=left|
|-align=center
|Win
|10–1–0
|align=left| Tony Pulu
| KO || 3 
|1979-06-14 || align=left| Olympic Auditorium, Los Angeles, California, United States
|align=left|
|-align=center
|Win
|9–1–0
|align=left| Beau Williford	
| KO || 2 
|1979-04-26 || align=left| Olympic Auditorium, Los Angeles, California, United States
|align=left|
|-align=center
|style="background:#abcdef;"|Draw
|8–1–0
|align=left| Eddie López
| PTS || 10 
|1979-03-01 || align=left| Olympic Auditorium, Los Angeles, California, United States
|align=left|
|-align=center
|Win
|8–0
|align=left| James Dixon
| KO || 2 
|1979-02-01 || align=left| Olympic Auditorium, Los Angeles, California, United States
|align=left|
|-align=center
|Win
|7–0
|align=left| Oliver Philipps
| TKO || 2 
|1978-10-26 || align=left| Olympic Auditorium, Los Angeles, California, United States
|align=left|
|-align=center
|Win
|6–0
|align=left| David Wynne	
| KO || 1
|1978-09-15 || align=left| Superdome, New Orleans, Louisiana, United States
|align=left|
|-align=center
|Win
|5–0
|align=left| Mark Junior
| KO || 2
|1978-07-27 || align=left| Olympic Auditorium, Los Angeles, California, United States
|align=left|
|-align=center
|Win
|4–0
|align=left| Dan Johnson
| KO || 6 
|1978-06-15 || align=left| Olympic Auditorium, Los Angeles, California, United States
|align=left|
|-align=center
|Win
|3–0
|align=left| Bob Swoopes
| PTS || 8 
|1978-05-18 || align=left| Olympic Auditorium, Los Angeles, California, United States
|align=left|
|-align=center
|Win
|2–0
|align=left| Rocky Jones
| KO || 1 
|1978-05-04 || align=left| Olympic Auditorium, Los Angeles, California, United States
|align=left|
|-align=center
|Win
|1–0
|align=left| Rocky Jones
| UD || 6 
| 1978-03-18 || align=left| The Aladdin, Las Vegas, Nevada, United States
|align=left|
|-align=center

References

External links
1974 Romanian National Championships
1975 Romanian National Championships
1976 Romanian National Championships
1977 Romanian National Championships

1954 births
Living people
Heavyweight boxers
Olympic boxers of Romania
Boxers at the 1976 Summer Olympics
Olympic silver medalists for Romania
Place of birth missing (living people)
Olympic medalists in boxing
Medalists at the 1976 Summer Olympics
Romanian defectors
Romanian male boxers